Charles Spencer Chaplin III (May 5, 1925 – March 20, 1968), known professionally as Charles Chaplin Jr., was an American actor. He was the elder son of Charlie Chaplin and Lita Grey, and is known for appearing in 1950s films such as The Beat Generation and Fangs of the Wild.

Early life
Chaplin was born in Beverly Hills, California. He was the elder son of actors Charlie Chaplin and Lita Grey. His half-siblings from his father's last marriage to Oona O'Neill are Geraldine, Michael, Josephine, Victoria, Eugene, Jane, Annette, and Christopher. His elder half-brother, Norman, died as an infant.

As young children, he and his younger brother, Sydney, were used as pawns in their mother's bitter divorce from Charlie Chaplin, during which a lot of the couple's "dirty linen" was aired in public, sensational divorce hearings. Following the divorce, the brothers were raised by their mother and maternal grandmother until the mid-1930s, when they began to make frequent visits to their father.

Chaplin attended the Black-Foxe Military Institute in Hollywood and the Lawrenceville School in Lawrenceville, New Jersey. He served in the U.S. Army in Europe during World War II.

Career
Chaplin acted in 13 films, appearing with his father in Limelight (1952). In 1959, he had a role in the film Girls Town which featured the son of another famous silent movie comedian, Harold Lloyd Jr. He appeared with his brother Sydney in the play Ethan Frome at the Circle Theatre, now named El Centro Theatre. In 1960, he wrote a book about his family life titled My Father, Charlie Chaplin.

Death

Chaplin died of a pulmonary embolism on March 20, 1968, in Santa Monica, California, aged 42. He is buried in the Abbey of the Psalms mausoleum at the Hollywood Forever Cemetery with his maternal grandmother Lillian Carrillo Curry Grey.

Selected filmography
 Limelight (1952) as Clown (uncredited)
 Columbus Discovers Kraehwinkel (1954)
 High School Confidential (1958)
 Girls Town (1959)

References

Further reading
Grey, Lita. My Life With Chaplin, Grove Press. 1966.
Grey, Lita; Vance, Jeffrey. Wife of the Life of the Party: A Memoir. Scarecrow Press. 1998.

External links

 
 

1925 births
1968 deaths
American male film actors
Burials at Hollywood Forever Cemetery
Lawrenceville School alumni
20th-century American male actors
Charles Jr.
Male actors from Beverly Hills, California
Military personnel from California
Deaths from pulmonary embolism
American people of British descent
American people of Irish descent
American people of English descent
American people of Scottish descent
American people of Spanish descent
United States Army personnel of World War II